Krasnyansky is a rural locality (a khutor) and the administrative center of Krasnyanskoye Rural Settlement, Kumylzhensky District, Volgograd Oblast, Russia. The population was 166 as of 2010. There are 3 streets.

Geography 
Krasnyansky is located in forest steppe, on Khopyorsko-Buzulukskaya Plain, on the right bank of the Medveditsa River, 50 km south of Kumylzhenskaya (the district's administrative centre) by road. Kozlov is the nearest rural locality.

References 

Rural localities in Kumylzhensky District